Dronyayevo is a rural locality in Makarovsky Selsoviet Rural Settlement, Kurchatovsky District, Kursk Oblast, Russia. Population:

Geography 
The village is located on the Seym River and its tributary, the Demina, 63 km from the Russia–Ukraine border, 40 km west of Kursk, 7 km north-west of the district center – the town Kurchatov, 7 km from the selsoviet center – Makarovka.

 Climate
Dronyayevo has a warm-summer humid continental climate (Dfb in the Köppen climate classification).

Transport 
Dronyayevo is located 31 km from the federal route  Crimea Highway, 6 km from the road of regional importance  (Kursk – Lgov – Rylsk – border with Ukraine), 2 km from the road of intermunicipal significance  (38K-017 – Nikolayevka – Shirkovo), on the road  (38N-362 – Dronyayevo), 6 km from the nearest railway halt Kurchatow (railway line Lgov I — Kursk).

The rural locality is situated 46 km from Kursk Vostochny Airport, 134 km from Belgorod International Airport and 249 km from Voronezh Peter the Great Airport.

References

Notes

Sources

Rural localities in Kurchatovsky District, Kursk Oblast